Bachia huallagana, Dixon's bachia, is a species of lizard in the family Gymnophthalmidae. It is endemic to    Peru.

References

Bachia
Reptiles of Peru
Endemic fauna of Peru
Reptiles described in 1973
Taxa named by James R. Dixon